Laburnum Grove is a 1936 British comedy film directed by Carol Reed and starring Edmund Gwenn, Cedric Hardwicke and Victoria Hopper. It was based on the 1933 play of the same name written by J. B. Priestley.

Plot summary
To rid himself of his sponging relatives a man tells them he is really a forger which causes them to leave. His wife believes he is joking, but he has in fact allowed the truth to slip out and now he is in danger of being arrested.

Cast
 Edmund Gwenn as Mr. Radfern
 Cedric Hardwicke as Mr. Baxley
 Victoria Hopper as Elsie Radfern
 Ethel Coleridge as Mrs. Baxley
 Katie Johnson as Mrs. Radfern
 Francis James as Harold Russ
 James Harcourt as Joe Fletten
 David Hawthorne as Inspector Stack
 Frederick Burtwell as Simpson

Novelization
In 1936, Heinemann, London issued, in hardcover, J. B. Priestley's Laburnum Grove "based on the famous stage play & film" by Ruth Holland. This book marked the second "collaboration" between Holland and Priestley, as she had three years before novelized his play Dangerous Corner. Ms. Holland was at the time known for at least one work of popular contemporary fiction of her own, The Lost Generation, a wartime novel. She was also, by way of Priestley's second marriage, his sister-in-law.

Reception
Writing for The Spectator in 1936, Graham Greene gave the film a good review, noting that "here at last is an English film one can unreservedly praise". Greene characterized the film as "thoroughly workmanlike and unpretentious", and praised director Reed for his difficult and successful adaptation of Priestley's original play.

References

Bibliography
 Evans, Peter William. Carol Reed. Manchester University Press, 2005.

External links

1936 films
1936 comedy films
British comedy films
Films directed by Carol Reed
British films based on plays
Films set in London
Associated Talking Pictures
Films based on works by J. B. Priestley
British black-and-white films
1930s English-language films
1930s British films
English-language comedy films